The men's skeet shooting competition at the 2000 Summer Olympics was the last shooting event of the Sydney Games, held on 22 and 23 September. Yang Ling successfully defended his title, a tenth of a point ahead of Oleg Moldovan.

Records
The existing world and Olympic records were as follows.

Qualification round
The slow runs were fired on Thursday and the fast runs on Friday.

Q Qualified for final

Final

References

Sources

Shooting at the 2000 Summer Olympics
Men's events at the 2000 Summer Olympics